Bahujana Nidahas Peramuna (People's Freedom Front/Mass Freedom Front) is a political party in Sri Lanka that was formed by Chandrika Kumaratunga when she broke away from Sri Lanka Mahajana Pakshaya. In 1993 Kumaratunga returned to SLFP; however, BNP continued to live on as a separate political party.

In the 1999 presidential elections, BNP nominated Alwis Weerakkody as their candidate.

References 

1991 establishments in Sri Lanka
Political parties established in 1991
Political parties in Sri Lanka